The San Bernard National Wildlife Refuge is a  wildlife conservation area along the coast of Texas (USA), south of the towns of Sweeny and Brazoria, Texas. It encloses a bay behind a barrier island at the Gulf of Mexico. The refuge is located in southern Brazoria and eastern Matagorda counties.

San Bernard National Wildlife Refuge was established in 1969 and provides quality habitat for wintering migratory waterfowl and other bird life. Viewing the rippling marshes and ponds of the refuge gives an image of Texas as it was before settlement.

Three national wildlife refuges on the Texas coast - Brazoria, San Bernard and Big Boggy - form a vital complex of coastal wetlands harboring more than 300 bird species.

Notes

References
 

Protected areas of Brazoria County, Texas
Protected areas of Matagorda County, Texas
National Wildlife Refuges in Texas
Wetlands of Texas
Landforms of Brazoria County, Texas
Landforms of Matagorda County, Texas
Protected areas established in 1969
1969 establishments in Texas